Each team's roster for the 2012 IIHF Women's World Championship consisted of at least 15 skaters (forwards, and defencemen) and 2 goaltenders, and at most 20 skaters and 3 goaltenders. All eight participating nations, through the confirmation of their respective national associations, had to submit a roster by the first IIHF directorate meeting on 6 April 2012.

Head coach:

Skaters

Goaltenders

Head coach:

Skaters

Goaltenders

Head coach:

Skaters

Goaltenders

Head coach:

Skaters

Goaltenders

Head coach:

Skaters

Goaltenders

Head coach:

Skaters

Goaltenders

Head coach:

Skaters

Goaltenders

Head coach:

Skaters

Goaltenders

References

Team rosters

Canada
Finland
Germany
Russia

Slovakia
Sweden
Switzerland
United States

Team statistics

Canada
Finland
Germany
Russia

Slovakia
Sweden
Switzerland
United States

External links
IIHF Site

rosters
IIHF Women's World Championship rosters